The New Zealand Schools rugby union team, commonly referred to as the New Zealand schoolboys rugby team, is composed of secondary school students in New Zealand. 

Many of the players have gone on to play for professional clubs or provinces or for the All Blacks or other international teams.

Recent squads
2019 New Zealand Schools Team

Due to COVID 19, in 2020 and 2021 teams were selected but did not play.

Notable past players

See also
 Australia national schoolboy rugby union team
 Ireland national schoolboy rugby union team
 New Zealand national under-19 rugby union team
 New Zealand national under-20 rugby union team
 New Zealand national under-21 rugby union team
 Junior All Blacks 
 New Zealand Heartland XV

References

New Zealand rugby union teams
schoolboy